Live @ Slim's / Turbulence Chest is a live album by a musical supergroup headed by DJ Disk under the name Phonopsychograph Disk.

Track listing
"Sycograph Intro" - 4:17
"Coffee Sack" - 4:48
"Duck's Decay" - 5:13
"Clear" - 5:18
"Blow?" - 5:10
"Slender Face" - 6:54
"Polar Bear Moonskreen" - 3:14
"Brain Practicing 'Asshole'" - 3:04
"Thinking Room Sculpture" - 4:15
"Employment Crystal Rooster" - 4:40
"Shaften the Turtle" - 1:43
"Fuckface Encore" - 8:35

rerelease Track listing
"Coffee Sack" - 4:48
"Duck's Decay" - 5:13
"Clear" - 5:18
"Blow?" - 5:10
"Slender Face" - 6:54
"Polar Bear Moonskreen" - 3:14
"Brain Pounding" - 3:04
"Thinking Room Sculpture" - 4:15
"Employment Crystal Rooster" - 4:40
"Shaften the Turtle" - 1:43
"Funkface Encore" - 8:35
"Confused but Stoned" - 6:66

Personnel
DJ Disk - turntable, vocoder
Brain - acoustic and electric drums
Buckethead - guitars and dolls
Extrakd - bass
Les Claypool - additional bass (tracks 5-12)
MCM - words (tracks 6, 11)
All tracks written by DJ Disk, except "Clear" by Cybotron, "Blow?" by Buckethead, and "Slender Face" by MCM and DJ Disk.

 

Buckethead albums
Les Claypool albums
1999 live albums